Lafayette Historic District may refer to:

Lafayette Historic District (Denver, Colorado), listed on the National Register of Historic Places in Denver County, Colorado
Lafayette Square Historic District (St. Louis, Missouri), listed on the National Register of Historic Places in St. Louis County, Missouri
Lafayette Historic District (Lafayette, Virginia), listed on the National Register of Historic Places in Montgomery County, Virginia
Lafayette Square Historic District (Washington, D.C.), listed on the National Register of Historic Places in Washington, D.C.